The 2021 Big West Conference women's basketball tournament (officially known as the Air Force Reserve Big West Women's Basketball Championship due to sponsorship reasons) was the postseason women's basketball tournament for the 2020–21 season in the Big West Conference. The tournament was held March 9–13, 2021. The tournament winner received an automatic invitation to the 2021 NCAA Division I women's basketball tournament. UC Davis won the conference tournament championship game over UC Irvine, 61–42.

Seeds
Teams are seeded by record within the conference, with a tie–breaker system to seed teams with identical conference records. Only the top nine teams in the conference will qualify for the tournament.

Schedule

Bracket

See also
2021 Big West Conference men's basketball tournament
Big West Conference women's basketball tournament

References 

2020–21 Big West Conference women's basketball season
Big West Conference women's basketball tournament
Basketball competitions in the Las Vegas Valley
Big West Women's Basketball
Women's sports in Nevada
College basketball tournaments in Nevada
College sports tournaments in Nevada